Monsters of Art or MOA (MOAS, MOAZ, VIM [Vandals in motion, Sweden], VIMOA, ALL, Norway, MOALL, VIMOALL, VIMOAS, VIMOAZ, VIMOAMSN [Maniaken Stoppen Nooit, Netherlands]) is a Danish graffiticrew. They are not only known in Denmark, they are also known as one of the biggest and most respected graffiticrews in the world. It was started by the Danish graffiti-artist Mins in the early 1990s.

External links
MOA on Belgian trains « Graffiti Art On Trains ».
https://web.archive.org/web/20090529145552/http://www.alanemmins.com/feature_syndication/graffiti_moa.html
moasgallery.com Co-established by one of the founding members of the Monsters of Art ‘Graffiti Crew’

Danish art